The First Purge is a 2018 American dystopian action horror film directed by Gerard McMurray and starring Y'lan Noel, Lex Scott Davis, Joivan Wade, and Steve Harris. Written and co-executive produced by James DeMonaco, it is the first film of The Purge series not to be directed by him.

It is the fourth installment in the Purge franchise. The film is a prequel depicting the origins of the annual "Purge", a 12-hour span once a year in which all crime in America, including murder, rape and arson, is legal; it originates as an experiment confined to Staten Island with the promise that those who stay on the island for its duration will be paid a large sum of money, but a new political party, the New Founding Fathers, is determined to get the results they want by any means necessary.

The First Purge was released on July 4, 2018, by Universal Pictures. It has grossed over $137 million worldwide, becoming the highest-grossing entry in the franchise, but received mixed reviews from critics like its predecessors. The fifth installment, The Forever Purge, was released on July 2, 2021.

Plot 
In an alternate 2014, rising unemployment, lack of jobs, rising inflation and a housing crisis leads to the New Founding Fathers of America (NFFA), led by U.S. president Bracken, to replace the Democrats and Republicans as the most powerful political party in the United States. A crazed drug addict named Skeletor discusses his dark thoughts, including his desire to "purge" and unleash his hatred on other people. An NFFA employee tells Skeletor that he can very soon.

Two years later, in 2016, NFFA chief of staff Arlo Sabian and sociologist Dr. May Updale announce an experiment to take place on Staten Island where for 12 hours, citizens will be allowed to purge and release their inhibitions in any way they choose, including murder. The NFFA offers residents $5,000 to stay during the experiment, with additional compensation if they join the purge and survive. They also outfit the participants with contact lens cameras so that they can monitor all activity and put tracking devices in them so they will know if they try to leave the island.

Low-lying drug kingpin and businessman Dmitri tells his dealers that they will not be leaving the island, as moving his large amounts of money and product will draw too much attention, and tells them to stay in a safe house and lay low. Dealer Capital A decides to defy this order and go out and purge, while newbie dealer Isaiah is attacked and injured by Skeletor. Isaiah goes to his sister Nya, an anti-Purge activist and Dmitri's ex-girlfriend, for treatment. As people flee Staten Island, Nya joins her friends Dolores, Luisa, and Selina in a church to wait out the Purge. Dmitri has stayed behind; Anna and Elsa, two prostitutes, are sent by his dealers to his office to keep him company. Skeletor commits the first Purge murder, and the video recorded by the NFFA goes viral. The NFFA also observe that most of the crimes taking place are minor ones such as looting, vandalism, disorderly conduct, and public disturbances like loud parties, as opposed to the expected violent ones like murder.

Isaiah secretly joins the Purge to get his revenge on Skeletor.  He eventually confronts him during the Purge but cannot shoot him. Isaiah runs off and into more purgers, before hiding and calling Nya for help. Anna and Elsa are revealed to be Purgers who attempt to kill Dmitri, but Dmitri fights them off and learns that Capital A had sent them in an attempt to take over Dmitri's business. Skeletor captures Nya in the streets and attempts to rape her, but Isaiah wounds him and they escape. Capital A and his crew go to Dmitri's office to thank Anna and Elsa for killing Dmitri, but Dmitri and his gang ambush him and kill them all, except for Anna and Elsa, who are told to never return to Staten Island. Nya and Isaiah return to the church to see blood-soaked white supremacist bikers leaving it. Although Nya's friend Luisa and her daughter Selina survive, Dolores' fate is unknown. They all return to Nya's apartment, where Dolores eventually manages to make it safely.

Meanwhile, at the NFFA headquarters, Updale becomes suspicious of a sudden increase in murder, along with the presence of masked participants. As she reviews the video footage of the Purge and notices vans full of masked killers arriving, she realizes to her horror that the  masked participants are trained mercenary groups killing multiple civilians. Sabian explains that he sent the mercenaries to make the experiment look successful, and eventually to help balance the wealth disequilibrium amongst the rich and the poor. Updale protests this tampering, realizing that the NFFA only wants to eradicate the poor to save the expense of social programs. Knowing that his corruption has been exposed, Sabian has Updale taken to Staten Island and executed, before erasing all footage of the event.

Dmitri and his gang escape through the streets, until unknown assailants attack them. Dmitri disposes of them all and discovers they are mercenaries. Realizing they were sent by the NFFA, who had also dumped weapons into the neighborhood to provoke participation, Dmitri and his crew decide to take a stand against them and protect the neighborhood. After saving local shop owner and friend Freddy and his associates, they go to Nya's apartment building to try and save her and her friends, but NFFA drones shoot and kill most of Dmitri's gang. Dmitri calls Nya and warns her of the mercenaries' invasion, but he is coming to help her. Dmitri successfully kills a number of mercenaries and helps Nya's group to hide in a safe space. A second group of mercenaries are about to shoot a rocket-propelled grenade into the apartments when a deranged Skeletor arrives and eliminates some mercenaries before he himself is killed. Dmitri grabs a piece of plastic explosive and gives it to Nya to throw it while he shoots it repeatedly until it explodes, killing the remaining mercenaries. As sirens sound the end of the Purge, a wounded Dmitri is hailed as a hero, and he states that the survivors must somehow fight back.

Sabian reads a statement calling this experimental Purge a success, and that a nationwide Purge may begin as soon as the following year, which leads into the events of the other films and directly ties into The Purge television series.

Cast

Production
In September 2016, James DeMonaco, the creator of the franchise, said that the fourth film, a follow-up to 2016's The Purge: Election Year, would be a prequel to the trilogy, showing how the United States came to the point of accepting the Purge Night. On February 17, 2017, DeMonaco announced that the fourth installment in The Purge franchise was in development at Universal Studios. DeMonaco did not return as director, but wrote the script and produced the film, with Jason Blum of Blumhouse Productions, Michael Bay, Andrew Form, and Brad Fuller of Platinum Dunes, and Sébastien K. Lemercier. In July 2017, Gerard McMurray, the director of Sundance film Burning Sands, was hired to direct the film from the script by DeMonaco.

On September 19, 2017, newcomers Y'lan Noel and Lex Scott Davis were cast in the film as the lead characters, and the setting was announced as Staten Island. Principal photography began in mid-September 2017 in Buffalo, New York. Filming wrapped on November 8, 2017. Kevin Lax composed the score for the film, replacing Nathan Whitehead. Back Lot Music released the soundtrack.

Release 
The First Purge was released on July 4, 2018, by Universal Pictures. It has grossed over $137 million worldwide, becoming the highest grossing entry in the franchise, but received mixed reviews from critics like its predecessors.

The film was released on Digital HD on September 18 and on 4K UHD, Blu-ray, DVD was released on October 2.

Reception

Box office
The First Purge grossed $69.5 million in the United States and Canada, and $67.5 million in other territories for a total worldwide gross of $137 million, against a production budget of $13 million.

In the United States and Canada, The First Purge was released on July 4, 2018, and was projected to gross around $25–36 million from 3,031 theaters over its five-day opening weekend. The film made $9.3 million on its first day, including $2.5 million from Tuesday night previews at 2,350 theaters, and $4.6 million on its second. It went on to open to $17.2 million (and a five-day total of $31.1 million), finishing fourth at the box office.

Critical response 
The website's critical consensus reads, "The First Purge should satisfy fans of the franchise and filmgoers in the mood for violent vicarious thrills, even if its subtextual reach exceeds its grasp." On Metacritic, which assigns a normalized rating to reviews, the film has a weighted average score of 54 out of 100, based on 39 critics, indicating "mixed or average reviews". Audiences polled by CinemaScore gave the film an average grade of "B−" on an A+ to F scale. The film drew attention for its critique of the Trump administration and U.S. politics in general.

According to the Movie and Television Review and Classification Board of the Philippines (MTRCB), the film contains mature themes, racism, excessive violence, sex and nudity, strong language, and drug use that may not be suitable for viewers under eighteen years old. The MTRCB classified the film as rated R-18.

See also
 List of African American films of the 2010s

Notes

References

External links 
 
 

The Purge films
2018 films
2018 action thriller films
2018 crime thriller films
2018 horror thriller films
2018 science fiction action films
2010s action horror films
2010s American films
2010s English-language films
2010s science fiction horror films
2010s science fiction thriller films
2010s serial killer films
African-American action films
African-American horror films
American action horror films
American action thriller films
American crime thriller films
American dystopian films
American horror thriller films
American prequel films
American science fiction action films
American science fiction horror films
American science fiction thriller films
American serial killer films
Blumhouse Productions films
Crime horror films
Films about corruption in the United States
Films about siblings
Films about terrorism in the United States
Films produced by Andrew Form
Films produced by Bradley Fuller
Films produced by Jason Blum
Films produced by Michael Bay
Films set in 2014
Films set in 2016
Films set in Staten Island
Films shot in Buffalo, New York
Films with screenplays by James DeMonaco
Hood films
Platinum Dunes films
Social science fiction films
Universal Pictures films
Urban survival films